The Thomsen Round Barn was an historical building located near Armstrong in rural Emmet County, Iowa, United States. It was built in 1912 as a dairy barn. The building is a true round barn that measures  in diameter. The first floor is constructed of concrete and the second floor consists of white vertical siding. It features a two-pitch conical roof, and a  central silo. The barn was listed on the National Register of Historic Places since 1986. As of July 21, 2014 it is no longer standing.

References

Infrastructure completed in 1912
Buildings and structures in Emmet County, Iowa
Barns on the National Register of Historic Places in Iowa
Round barns in Iowa
1912 establishments in Iowa
National Register of Historic Places in Emmet County, Iowa